A foil is an architectural device based on a symmetrical rendering of leaf shapes, defined by overlapping circles of the same diameter that produce a series of cusps to make a lobe. Typically, the number of cusps can be three (trefoil), four (quatrefoil), five (cinquefoil), or a larger number (multifoil). 

Foil motifs may be used as part of the heads and tracery of window lights, complete windows themselves, the underside of arches, in heraldry, within panelling, and as part of any decorative or ornament device. Foil types are commonly found in Gothic and Islamic architecture.

References

Ornaments (architecture)
Symbols
Heraldic charges
Visual motifs